Marygold International School is a private, co-educational, boarding  and day school founded by Mr. Obinna and Mrs. Janeth Weli in 2002. The school provides crèche, toddler, pre-nursery, nursery, primary and secondary school facilities. Its main building is located at 58 Station Road, Elelenwo, Port Harcourt, Rivers State, Nigeria.

Departments
The school currently includes the following departments:

Science department
Music department
ICT department
Phonics department
Vocational department

References

External links

Schools in Port Harcourt
Boarding schools in Rivers State
Private schools in Rivers State
Co-educational boarding schools
2002 establishments in Nigeria
2000s establishments in Rivers State
Educational institutions established in 2002
Secondary schools in Rivers State
Elelenwo, Port Harcourt